Ahmed Al Ahmed is a Syrian player born on 18 October 1996. He plays for Al-Ittihad in Syrian Premier League. He started his career with Al-Hurriya before he joined Al-Ittihad.

On 14 January 2019, he joined Damac, Saudi division 1 team. Which he considered as big step in order to play for the biggest teams in the future.

His older brother Mohammad plays for Al-Ittihad.

International career
He got his first cap on 20 March 2019 against Iraq in 2019 International Friendship Championship.

References

External links

1996 births
Living people
Syrian footballers
Syrian expatriate footballers
Syria international footballers
Association football midfielders
People from Aleppo
Syrian expatriate sportspeople in Saudi Arabia
Expatriate footballers in Saudi Arabia
Saudi First Division League players
Al-Ittihad Aleppo players
Hurriya SC players
Damac FC players
Syrian Premier League players